Enthrone Darkness Triumphant is the third studio album by Norwegian symphonic black metal band Dimmu Borgir, released on 30 May 1997 through Nuclear Blast. It was the band's first release through Nuclear Blast. This is the last release to feature keyboardist Stian Aarstad and the first with bassist  Nagash.

Release
The album has been released on many formats, including a limited edition vinyl (300 white and 1000 black). In 2002, a deluxe CD version was released with bonus material. Enthrone Darkness Triumphant was also the band's first album to display their second logo, though the old "black metal" logo is seen in the back cover artwork on the original printing. Due to concerns from Nuclear Blast, the lyrics of "Tormentor of Christian Souls" were omitted from the disc's liner notes. "Master of Disharmony" and "Raabjorn speiler Draugheimens skodde" are re-recorded versions of older, already released tracks (from Devil's Path and For all tid respectively).

Critical reception

AllMusic praised the album, writing, "One of the most important Scandinavian metal discs ever, Dimmu Borgir's Enthrone Darkness Triumphant is the group's unquestioned masterpiece." In 2005, Enthrone Darkness Triumphant was ranked number 298 in Rock Hard magazine's book of The 500 Greatest Rock & Metal Albums of All Time.

In 2020, it was named one of the 20 best metal albums of 1997 by Metal Hammer magazine. In 2021, the magazine ranked it as the 7th best symphonic metal album of all time.

The album has occasionally faced some criticism. Death Metal Underground labels it "a ripoff of bands that were new when these musicians were born," noting that it lacks a sense of theme and that it is essentially "a pop album with heavy metal riffs," which wants the "neoclassical orchestration that made [the previous album] Stormblåst brilliant."

Track listing

Charts

Personnel
Dimmu Borgir
Shagrath – lead vocals, lead guitar, production
Silenoz – rhythm guitar, production
Stian Aarstad – synthesizer, piano, production
Tjodalv – drums, production
Nagash – bass, lead guitar, background vocals, production

Additional personnel
Bente Engen – vocals (track 5)
Peter Tägtgren – engineering, mixing

References

Dimmu Borgir albums
1997 albums
Nuclear Blast albums